Carol Harlow QC FBA is a British barrister and academic, emeritus professor of law at the London School of Economics (LSE).  Her doctoral thesis was titled Administrative liability: a comparative study of French and English Law.

Selected publications
Law and administration, 3rd edn 2009
Accountability in the European Union, 2000
State liability: Tort Law and Beyond, 2002
The Concepts and Methods of Reasoning of the New Public Law - A New Legislation?, 2011
National administrative procedures in a European Perspective: Pathways to a slow convergence?, 2010
Accountability as a Value in Global Governance and for Global Administrative Law, 2011

References

Living people
Academics of the London School of Economics
Fellows of the British Academy
Honorary Fellows of the London School of Economics
Year of birth missing (living people)
British barristers